The Diocese of  Lweru is a diocese in the Anglican Church of Tanzania: the current bishop is Godfrey Mbelwa.

Notes

Anglican Church of Tanzania dioceses
Anglican bishops of Lweru